Excelsior is an unincorporated community in Morgan County, Missouri.

History
Excelsior was laid out in 1868. A post office called Excelsior was established in 1866 and remained in operation until 1922.

References

Unincorporated communities in Morgan County, Missouri
Unincorporated communities in Missouri